Linnaeoxanthus is a genus of crab, whose only species is Linnaeoxanthus acanthomerus. Linnaeoxanthus is the only genus of the family Linnaeoxanthidae.

References

Xanthoidea
Monotypic arthropod genera